Carl Schneider (born November 19, 1992) is a retired American soccer player who played as a defender.

Career

Youth and college career
Schneider began his youth career with Madison 56ers, while also appearing for Mequon United in the Super Y League from 2006 to 2007. During high school, he appeared for the La Follette Lancers, where he was named Wisconsin State Journal Player of the Year and second team all-state as a senior after leading the team to their first Big Eight Conference title. In 2012, Schneider joined the Wisconsin Badgers, making 61 appearances and scoring 2 goals for the team.

Early club career
Between 2011 and 2014, Schneider appeared for the Madison 56ers senior team in the NPSL. He also appeared for the team in the 2013 U.S. Open Cup.

In 2015, he joined Des Moines Menace in the PDL. He made six league appearances for the team, while also appearing in the second round of the 2015 U.S. Open Cup.

Move to Sweden
In 2016, Schneider trained with Bridges FC and participated on their European tour. He was noticed by IFK Åmål in the Swedish sixth-division, the Division 4 Bohuslän/Dalsland, and signed with the team in July 2016. He helped the team gain promotion to Division 3. In subsequent seasons, he made 40 league appearances, scoring 2 goals, and also appeared in the 2018–19 Svenska Cupen. In 2018 he helped the team gain promotion to Division 2 of Swedish football.

Forward Madison
In 2019, Schneider returned to the United States after signing with hometown club Forward Madison FC for their inaugural season, competing in USL League One. He became the first Madison native to sign with the team. He made his league debut for the club on April 13, 2019 in a 1-0 away defeat to North Texas SC.

Michigan Stars
On April 6, 2021, Schneider joined National Independent Soccer Association side Michigan Stars FC.

Return to Forward Madison
On March 28, 2022, Schneider returned to Forward Madison. Schneider appeared in one game in his return for the club, starting in a 3–0 victory over Cleveland SC in the second round of the 2022 U.S. Open Cup.

Retirement
Schneider announced his retirement from professional soccer on a podcast following the 2022 season.

Personal life
Schneider was born in Madison, Wisconsin.

References

External links
 
 
 

1992 births
Living people
Sportspeople from Madison, Wisconsin
Soccer players from Wisconsin
American soccer players
American expatriate soccer players
American expatriate sportspeople in Sweden
Expatriate footballers in Sweden
Association football defenders
Wisconsin Badgers men's soccer players
Des Moines Menace players
IFK Åmål players
Forward Madison FC players
National Premier Soccer League players
USL League One players
USL League Two players
Division 3 (Swedish football) players
Michigan Stars FC players